Czech Republic competed at the 2012 Summer Paralympics in London, United Kingdom from August 29 to September 9, 2012.

Medalists

Archery

Men

|-
|align=left|Leos Bartoš
|rowspan=3 align=left|Men's individual compound open
|657
|7
|W 7-1
|W 6-0
|L 0-6
|colspan=3|Did not advance
|-
|align=left|Jiri Klich
|637
|17
|W 6-4
|L 5-6
|colspan=4|Did not advance
|-
|align=left|Jaroslav Zelenka
|619
|27
|L 0-6
|colspan=5|Did not advance
|-
|align=left|Petr Bartoš
|rowspan=2 align=left|Men's individual compound W1
|546
|12
|
|L 0-6
|colspan=4|Did not advance
|-
|align=left|David Drahonínský
|662
|1
|colspan=2 
|W 6-5
|W 6-0
|L 2-6
|
|}

Women

|-
|align=left|Miroslava Cerna
|rowspan=3 align=left|Women's individual recurve
|442
|18
|L 6-2
|colspan=5|Did not advance
|-
|align=left|Lenka Kuncova
|483
|15
|W 6-2
|L 3-7
|colspan=4|Did not advance
|-
|align=left|Marketa Sidkova
|488
|14
|W 6-0
|W 6-2
|L 5-6
|colspan=3|Did not advance
|-
|align=left|Miroslava Cerna Lenka Kuncova Marketa Sidkova
|align=left|Women's team recurve
|1413
|7
|colspan=2 
|L 167-189
|colspan=3|Did not advance
|}

Athletics

Boccia

Individual events

Pairs event

Cycling

Swimming

Table tennis

See also
Czech Republic at the Paralympics
Czech Republic at the 2012 Summer Olympics

References

Nations at the 2012 Summer Paralympics
2012
2012 in Czech sport